Pa Qaleh (also Romanized as Pā Qal‘eh; also known as Pā’īn Qal‘eh, Pāi Qal‘eh, and Pa yi Qal‘eh) is a village in Pa Qaleh Rural District, in the Central District of Shahr-e Babak County, Kerman Province, Iran. At the 2006 census, its population was 138, in 37 families.

References 

Populated places in Shahr-e Babak County